Antiochus of Ascalon (c. 125 – c. 68 BC) was an Academic philosopher. He was a pupil of Philo of Larissa at the Academy, but he diverged from the Academic skepticism of Philo and his predecessors. He was a teacher of Cicero, and the first of a new breed of eclectics among the Platonists; he endeavoured to bring the doctrines of the Stoics and the Peripatetics into Platonism, and stated, in opposition to Philo, that the mind could distinguish true from false. In doing so, he claimed to be reviving the doctrines of the Old Academy. With him began the phase of philosophy known as Middle Platonism.

Life
Antiochus was born in Ashkelon, Palestine. He was a friend of Lucullus (the antagonist of Mithridates) and the teacher of Cicero during his studies at Athens in 79 BC; but he had a school at Alexandria also, as well as in Syria, where he seems to have died. He was a philosopher of considerable reputation in his time, for Strabo in describing Ascalon, mentions his birth there as a mark of distinction for the city, and Cicero frequently speaks of him in affectionate and respectful terms as the best and wisest of the Academics, and the most polished and acute philosopher of his age.

Antiochus studied under the Stoic Mnesarchus, but his principal teacher was Philo, who succeeded Clitomachus as the head (scholarch) of the Academy. He is, however, better known as the adversary rather than the disciple of Philo; and Cicero mentions a treatise called Sosus, written by him against his master, in which he refutes the scepticism of the Academics. Another of his works, called Canonica, is quoted by Sextus Empiricus, and appears to have been a treatise on logic.

Antiochus was called the founder of the "fifth Academy," in the same way that Philo was called the founder of the fourth. This split occurred just before the First Mithridatic War began in 88, which would lead to the destruction of the Academy in 86. During this time, Antiochus was resident in Alexandria. He had returned to Athens by the time Cicero studied there in 79, and he seems to have died around 68.

Philosophy
The Academic skepticism of the Academy before Antiochus probably had its origin in Plato's successful attempts to lead his disciples to abstract reasoning as the right method of discovering truth, and not to trust too much to the impressions of the senses. Cicero even ranks Plato himself with those philosophers who held that there was no such thing as certainty in any kind of knowledge.

Later philosophers, either by insisting exclusively on the uncertainty of the senses, like Arcesilaus, or like Carneades and Philo, by extending the same to reason, had fallen into a degree of scepticism that seemed to strike at the root of all truth, theoretical and practical. It was, therefore, the chief object of Antiochus, besides promoting particular doctrines in moral philosophy, to examine the grounds of our knowledge, and our capacities for discovering truth; though no complete judgment can be formed of his success, as the book in which Cicero gave the fullest representation of his opinions has been lost.

Antiochus professed to be reviving the doctrines of the Old Academy, or of Plato's school, when he maintained, in opposition to Philo and Carneades, that the intellect had in itself a test by which it could distinguish truth from falsehood; or in the language of the Academics, discern between the images arising from actual objects and those conceptions that had no corresponding reality. For the argument of the sceptics was, that if two notions were so exactly similar as that they could not be distinguished, neither of them could be said to be known with more certainty than the other; and that every true notion was liable to have a false one of this kind attached to it: therefore nothing could be certainly known. This reasoning was opposed by the assertion that the mind contained within itself the standard of truth and falsehood; it was also attacked more generally by the argument that all such reasoning refutes itself, since it proceeds upon principles assumed to be true, and then concludes that there can be no certain ground for any assumption at all. In this manner Antiochus seems to have taken the side of the Stoics in defending the senses from the charge of complete uncertainty brought against them by the Academics.

It is evident that in such discussions the same questions were examined which had formerly been more thoroughly sifted by Plato and Aristotle, in analyzing the nature of science and treating of the different kinds of truth, according as they were objects of pure intellectual apprehension, or only of probable and uncertain knowledge. The result was an attempt to revive the dialectic art which the Academics had ignored, so the existing accounts of Antiochus' moral teaching seem to show. Without yielding to the paradoxes of the Stoics, or the skepticism of the Academics, he held in the main doctrines nearly coinciding with those of Aristotle: that happiness consists essentially in a virtuous life, yet is not independent of external things. So he denied the Stoic doctrine that all crimes were equal, but agreed with them in holding that all the emotions ought to be suppressed. On the whole, therefore, though Cicero inclines to rank him among the Stoics, it appears that he considered himself an eclectic philosopher, and attempted to unite the doctrines of the Stoics and Peripatetics, so as to revive the old Academy.

See also
 Academica (Cicero)
 De finibus bonorum et malorum

Notes

References

Further reading
 Algra, K., J. Barnes, J. Mansfeld and M. Schofield (eds.), 1999. The Cambridge History of Hellenistic Philosophy, Cambridge: Cambridge University Press.
 Barnes, J., 1989. “Antiochus of Ascalon”, in Philosophia Togata: Essays on Philosophy and Roman Society, M. Griffin and J. Barnes (eds.), Oxford: Oxford University Press.
 Dillon, J., The Middle Platonists, 2° éd., Ithaca: Cornell University Press, 1996. Chap. 2.
 Fleischer, K., “Der Stoiker Mnesarch als Lehrer des Antiochus im Index Academicorum”, in Mnemosyne 68/3, 2015, pp. 413–423.
 Glucker, J., Antiochus and the Late Academy, Göttingen: Vandenhoeck & Ruprecht, 1978.
 Sedley, D. (ed.), The Philosophy of Antiochus, Cambridge: Cambridge University Press, 2012.
 Striker, G., “Academics fighting Academics”, in Brad Inwood & Jaap Mansfeld, Assent and Argument. Studies in Cicero's Academic Books, Leiden: Brill, 1997, pp. 257–275.
 Tarrant, H., Scepticism or Platonism? The Philosophy of the Fourth Academy, Cambridge: Cambridge University Press, 1985.

External links
 
 Middle Platonism Internet Encyclopedia of Philosophy

120s BC births
60s BC deaths
2nd-century BC Romans
1st-century BC philosophers
1st-century BC Romans
Academic philosophers
Ancient Greek educators
Ancient Greeks from Ashkelon
Hellenistic-era philosophers from Asia
Hellenistic-era philosophers in Athens
Middle Platonists